Juan Espino Reyes (born March 16, 1956 in Bonao, Dominican Republic) is a retired Major League Baseball catcher. He played during four seasons at the major league level for the New York Yankees.

References

External links

1956 births
Living people
Columbus Clippers players
Dominican Republic expatriate baseball players in the United States
Fort Lauderdale Yankees players

Maine Guides players
Major League Baseball catchers
Major League Baseball players from the Dominican Republic
Nashville Sounds players
New York Yankees players
Oneonta Yankees players
People from Bonao
Richmond Braves players
West Haven Yankees players